Sadia Olivier Bleu (born 26 December 1997), known as Sadia Olivier, is an Ivorian professional footballer who plays as a midfielder for Iraqi Premier League club Amanat Baghdad.

Club career

Early career
Sadia was born in Bangolo, Ivory Coast. He started playing at a very young age and he joined Salef Academy in Ivory Coast and also made his debut for senior team at the age of 18.

Ghazl Mahalla
In August 2019, Sadia signed with Egyptian second division club Ghazl El Mahalla. It was a successful season for both Sadia and his team, they top the group and gained qualification to Egyptian Premier League for the season 2020–21.

Amanat Baghdad
In January 2021, Sadia signed with Iraqi Premier League club Amanat Baghdad SC.

Honors
Ghazl Mahalla
Egyptian Second Division: 
 Winners : 2019–20

References

External links
 

1997 births
Living people
Ivorian footballers
Ivorian expatriate footballers
Expatriate footballers in Iraq
Ivorian expatriate sportspeople in Egypt
Ivorian expatriate sportspeople in Iraq
Amanat Baghdad players
Ghazl El Mahalla SC players
Association football forwards